Pedro de Valdivia was the Conquistador of Chile, and the Capture of the City of Valdivia was one of the first victories of the Chilean Navy. Several ships of the Chilean Navy have been named Valdivia: 

  renamed Valdivia after her capture by the Chilean Navy
 Valdivia (1865), ex-Henriette 
 Valdivia (1903), built in Behrens Shipyard, Valdivia 
 Valdivia (1927), a dredger built in Conrad Weft, Netherlands 
 Valdivia (1943) ex-USS LCM-24958 of the US Navy 
 Valdivia (1970), a Newport-class tank landing ship

Chilean Navy ship names